Ludvika FK is a Swedish football club located in Ludvika in Dalarna County.

Background
Since their foundation Ludvika FK has participated mainly in the upper and middle divisions of the Swedish football league system.  The club plays in Division 3 Västra Svealand which is the fifth tier of Swedish football. They play their home matches at the Hillängens IP in Ludvika.

Ludvika FK are affiliated to Dalarnas Fotbollförbund.

Ludvika FK played in the Allsvenskan in season 1944/45, but were called Ludvika FfI at that time.

Stars of today is Albin Lindblom #19 and Benjamin Scheir #1

Recent history
In recent seasons Ludvika FK have competed in the following divisions:

2014 – Division III, Västra Svealand
2013 – Division IV, Dalarna
2012 – Division IV, Dalarna
2011 – Division III, Västra Svealand
2010 – Division III, Västra Svealand
2009 – Division IV, Dalarna
2008 – Division III, Västra Svealand
2007 – Division III, Södra Norrland
2006 – Division III, Västra Svealand
2005 – Division III, Västra Svealand
2004 – Division II, Västra Svealand
2003 – Division II, Västra Svealand
2002 – Division II, Västra Svealand
2001 – Division III, Västra Svealand
2000 – Division III, Västra Svealand
1999 – Division II, Västra Svealand
1998 – Division I, Norra
1997 – Division II, Västra Svealand
1996 – Division II, Västra Svealand
1995 – Division II, Västra Svealand
1994 – Division II, Västra Svealand
1993 – Division II, Västra Svealand

Attendances

Ludvika FK have had the following average attendances:

Footnotes

External links
 Ludvika FK – Official website
 Ludvika FK on Facebook

Football clubs in Dalarna County
Association football clubs established in 1975
1975 establishments in Sweden